Lawrence A. Cunningham (born July 10, 1962) is a lawyer, professor, corporate advisor, and author. He is the founder and managing partner of the Quality Shareholders Group and special counsel with Mayer Brown LLP, the international law firm. Cunningham is best known as an expert on corporate governance. He is also known for his knowledge of the history and corporate culture of Berkshire Hathaway and Warren Buffett.

Early life
Cunningham's father died when Cunningham was 13, when he enrolled in Girard College, a high school in Philadelphia, Pennsylvania. He worked full-time to put himself through his home-state school, University of Delaware, graduating with a Bachelor of Arts in economics. He then attended and graduated from the Benjamin N. Cardozo School of Law of Yeshiva University with a JD degree magna cum laude in 1988.

Career
From 1988 to 1994, Cunningham practiced corporate law with Cravath, Swaine & Moore, specializing in corporate governance, corporate finance and M&A. 

From 1994 to 2002, he taught at the Cardozo School of Law, where he directed The Samuel and Ronnie Heyman Center on Corporate Governance, and wrote several books on value investing. From 2002 to 2007, he was professor of law and business and vice dean at Boston College.  

From 2007 to 2022, he was the Henry St. George Tucker III Research Professor at George Washington University where he founded and for many years ran GW in New York (a training program for GW Law School students interested in business law) and the Quality Shareholders Initiative. Since 2022, he has been the managing general partner of the Quality Shareholders Group, and continues to direct GW's Quality Shareholders Initiative.

Cunningham is a director of Constellation Software Inc. and since 2019, its vice chairman.  Cunningham is also a director of Kelly Partners Group.  In 2023, he joined Mayer Brown LLP as Special Counsel, advising public company boards on corporate governance.

Honors
In 2018, he received the B. Kenneth West Lifetime Achievement Award from the National Association of Corporate Directors (NACD), in recognition of his board service, board advice, and research on corporate governance.

Selected publications
Cunningham has done work for the Securities Investor Protection Corp. (SIPC) and PCAOB, as well as writing popular accounts of AIG and Berkshire Hathaway. He also wrote several influential books on investing, including quality investing (about governance as stewardship for shareholders). He writes a regular column for MarketWatch, Cunningham's Quality Investing. He has written or edited about 50 scholarly articles, including articles in law reviews, and published a dozen books. His textbook on accounting is the standard teaching book in US law schools. 

 
 
 
 
 
 Margin of Trust: The Berkshire Business Model. Columbia University Press. 2020. 
 Dear Shareholder: The Best Executive Letters. Harriman House. 2020.
 Quality Shareholders. Columbia University Press. 2020.

References

External links
Lawrence A. Cunningham publications via George Washington University

Living people
1962 births
University of Delaware alumni
Benjamin N. Cardozo School of Law alumni
Boston College faculty
American finance and investment writers
Writers from Delaware
George Washington University faculty